Cornelius Henry DeLamater (August 30, 1821 – February 2, 1889) was an industrialist who owned DeLamater Iron Works in New York City.  The steam boilers and machinery for the ironclad  were built in DeLamater's foundry during the Civil War.  Swedish marine engineer and inventor John Ericsson considered DeLamater his closest, most intimate friend.

Life
Cornelius H. DeLamater was born on August 30, 1821, in Rhinebeck, New York, his family moving to New York City when Cornelius was three years old. His father was hired by a very small iron foundry, the Phoenix Iron Works of James Cunningham on West Street, as cashier and confidential advisor.  At 16, Cornelius entered the Phoenix Foundry, and at age 20, upon the death of Cunningham, he formed a co-partnership with Peter Hogg under the name Hogg and DeLamater.  This firm continued from 1842 to 1857, when Hogg retired from the business.  The firm was re-formed as the DeLamater Iron Works, and moved to the foot of West 13th Street on the West side of Manhattan.

At an early age, DeLamater developed an unusual ability in solving problems that were then developing in regard to steam engineering and machinery. In time, the DeLamater Iron Works became known as the asylum where inventors and capitalists could go to experiment and attempt new feats. The Iron Witch was next constructed, the first iron steamboat. The hot air engine of Capt. Ericsson was first introduced in the ship Ericsson, which was built entirely by DeLamater. The DeLamater Iron Works was also the place where the first submarine boat, first self-propelled torpedo, first torpedo boat, and the engines for the original Monitor were built.
At the time of his death, the DeLamater Iron Works employed over 1000 men.

Eaton's Neck Estate

DeLamater's leisure moments were spent at Beacon Farm on Eatons Neck, Long Island, New York, where he had  of choice land on the North Shore of Long Island, and the "finest blooded stock in America" as described by The New York Times. The DeLamater Estate included everything beyond what is today #325 Asharoken Avenue.  This includes the upper half of Asharoken Beach, the Morgan Estate, the Eaton Harbors or Two Acre Zone of Eaton's Neck, and the Bevin Road peninsula in Asharoken.  The DeLamater Mansion still stands today on the Eatons Neck peninsula, and was rented in 1942 by French author Antoine de Saint Exupéry who wrote The Little Prince while at the mansion.  The children and grandchildren of DeLamater also built mansions over time in Eaton's Neck and Asharoken that still stand today, namely "The Point", "The Nest", "The Crest", and "The Hill".  The DeLamaters also renovated two existing colonial structures for family estates, namely "Cherry Lawn" and "Oak Leaf".

Death
On February 2, 1889, Cornelius DeLamater died at his home in New York City, and over 600 of his employees attended his funeral, with 500 of them accompanying the casket on board a special train that took the funeral procession from Manhattan to Woodlawn Cemetery in the Bronx.

See also

 Eatons Neck
 John Ericsson
 Delamater-Bevin Mansion
 National Register of Historic Places listings in Suffolk County, New York

References

External links
 Cornelius H. DeLamater biography

Spinzia, Raymond E. and Judith A. Long Island's Prominent North Shore Families: Their Estates and Their Country Homes. vol I. College Station, TX 
VirtualBookworm, 2006. (spinzialongislandestates.com)

1821 births
1889 deaths
American manufacturing businesspeople
Houses on the National Register of Historic Places in New York (state)
People from Huntington, New York
Burials at Woodlawn Cemetery (Bronx, New York)
Houses in Suffolk County, New York
National Register of Historic Places in Suffolk County, New York
19th-century American businesspeople